Preet Na Kariyo Koi is Pakistani romantic comedy drama serial aired on 3 November 2015 to 8 March 2016 on Hum TV. It is written by Amna Mufti, directed by Ehteshamuddin and produced by Momina Duraid under her production company. It stars Ahsan Khan and Hira Salman in lead roles. The series received acclaim due to script, direction and Mani's performance.

Plot
Preet Na Kariyo Koi is a story of Shagufta, Ilyas and Shams. Shagufta is a simple small town girl who is engaged to her cousin Ilyas. Ilyas runs a dress shop and avoids street fights and corporate politics, however Shagufta views him as weak and dreams of marrying a striking and courageous man who can stand up for himself and his family. Shagufta starts to admire her college mate Shams and the admiration transforms into a relationship that leads her to take life changing decision. In what capacity will Shagufta live with the improvements that occur in her life once Shams enters it?

Cast
 Ahsan Khan as Shams  
 Hira Salman as Shagufta Shehzadi a.k.a. Goshi
 Noor Zafar Khan as Noor-ul-Ain a.k.a. Noori
 Saman Ansari as Zarina
 Mira Sethi as Mariam 
 Adnan Shah Tipu as Mushtaq 
 Irfan Khoosat as Fayyaz 
 Rehan Sheikh as Sulehri Sahab 
 Fariya Hassan as Saima
 Hassan Noman as Ilyas 
 Naghma as Ilyas's mother
 Zain Mumtaz Raja as Bhola

Soundtrack

The title song was sung by Rahat Fateh Ali Khan. The music was composed by Sahir Ali Bagga and the lyrics were written by Imran Raza.

Production 

Mani was cast to portray the leading role of Shagufta Shehzadi by producer Momina Duraid after judging her performance in Duraid's Firaaq (2014). The series thus marked her first appearance in a leading role and her first appearance with Khan, the second being Aangan (2018) which was also directed by Ehteshamuddin.

The series has been shoot in Karachi, Lahore and Hyderabad.

Reception 

Preet Na Kariyo Koi received positive reviews with praise towards the Ehteshamuddin's cinematography, Mufti's script and performances of the actors, especially of Hira Mani's performance who received critical praise for portraying an emotionally intense and strong-headed woman. In an article, Express Tribune praised the women portrayal in the series stating, "With dramas like Udaari and Preet Na Kariyo Koi promising the return of challenging and unique female roles,..." The Friday Times also praised the strong and nuanced depiction of the female protagonist.

References

External links

 Official Website 
 Preet na kariyo koi episode archive
  

Hum TV
Hum Network Limited
Hum TV original programming
Urdu-language television shows
Pakistani drama television series
Serial drama television series
2015 Pakistani television series debuts
2016 Pakistani television series endings
Television series about dysfunctional families
Television series set in Lahore
Television series set in Punjab, Pakistan